The Center for the Advancement of Women was a New York City nonprofit institution dedicated to research-based education and advocacy for women.  An independent, non-partisan organization founded in 1995 and led by Faye Wattleton, the organization works for the advancement of women. The organization conducts national opinion research among women to measure experiences in their daily lives. This research presents a profile of women that is used to educate opinion leaders, policy makers and the general public.

Founding 
The organization was founded as Center for Gender Equality in 1995. It was known as that name until 2002. Focused on research-based education and advocacy for women, the Center for Advancement of Women's mission was "to conduct national opinion research among women to measure experiences in their daily lives. This research presents a profile of women that [was hopefully] used to educate opinion leaders, policy makers and the general public."

Projects 
One of the significant research projects undertaken by the CFAW beginning in the late 1990s and lasting several years was "Progress and Perils: A New Agenda for Women," a landmark survey of over 3,000 American women that measured opinions on various topics, such as domestic abuse, sexual assault, affirmative action, and abortion rights. The responses were tabulated so as to reflect any differences based on race.

Other research projects included the Domestic Violence Report (an outgrowth to the "Progress and Perils" results), a National Security Report in response to 9/11, the Women on Religion Survey, and the Women in Science, Engineering and Technology Report.

Closure 
Throughout its fifteen years, the CFAW depended on donors, large and small, to do its work and, after years of financial struggle, the organization closed down.

References

External links
 Center for the Advancement of Women records at Sophia Smith Collection, Smith College Special Collections

Gender studies organizations
Organizations established in 1995
Feminist organizations in the United States
Women in New York City